Li Ke (born 1 July 1969) is a Chinese windsurfer. She finished 4th in the Women's Mistral One Design event at the 1996 Summer Olympics.

References

External links
 
 

1969 births
Living people
Olympic sailors of China
Chinese windsurfers
Female windsurfers
Chinese female sailors (sport)
Sailors at the 1996 Summer Olympics – Mistral One Design
Asian Games gold medalists for China
Asian Games medalists in sailing
Sailors at the 1994 Asian Games
Medalists at the 1994 Asian Games
People from Fushun
Sportspeople from Liaoning
20th-century Chinese women